Thomas J. Holding (25 January 1880 – 4 May 1929) was a British-born stage and film actor.

Biography
Born in England in 1880, Holding possibly had an extensive stage career in his native Britain before arriving in the United States. He was popular in American silent films during the World War I years. His first films were in several features starring the actress Pauline Frederick. Holding died in 1929 of a heart attack in his dressing room while acting on Broadway according to Variety of 8 May 1929.

Partial filmography

The Eternal City (1915)
Sold (1915)
The White Pearl (1915)
Bella Donna (1915)
Lydia Gilmore (1915)
The Spider (1916)
The Moment Before (1916)
Silks and Satins (1916)
Redeeming Love (1916)
The Great White Trail (1917)
Her Fighting Chance (1917)
 Magda (1917)
Daughter of Destiny (1917)
The Dream Lady (1918)
The Vanity Pool (1918)
The Lady of Red Butte (1919)
One Week of Life (1919)
The Peace of Roaring River (1919)
 Her Kingdom of Dreams (1919)
The Lone Wolf's Daughter (1919)
A Woman Who Understood (1920)
 The Honey Bee (1920)
The Woman in His House (1920)
Sacred and Profane Love (1921)
Without Benefit of Clergy (1921)
 The Lure of Jade (1921)
The Three Musketeers (1921)
Rose o' the Sea (1922)
 The Strangers' Banquet (1922)
The Trouper (1922)
Ruggles of Red Gap (1923)
The Courtship of Miles Standish (1923)
The White Monkey (1925)
One Way Street (1925)
The Reckless Lady (1926)
The Untamed Lady (1926)
The Nest (1927)
Satan and the Woman (1928)

References

External links

 
 

1880 births
1929 deaths
Male actors from Kent
People from Blackheath, London
English male film actors
English male stage actors
British expatriate male actors in the United States
20th-century English male actors